Aarsh Jha (born 10 December 1997) is a Zimbabwean cricketer. He made his first-class debut for Rising Stars in the 2017–18 Logan Cup on 4 October 2017. He made his List A debut on 4 February 2020, for Matabeleland Tuskers in the 2019–20 Pro50 Championship. In December 2020, he was selected to play for the Tuskers in the 2020–21 Logan Cup.

References

External links
 

1997 births
Living people
Zimbabwean cricketers
Place of birth missing (living people)
Matabeleland Tuskers cricketers
Rising Stars cricketers